Bernard  Semes (January 29, 1919 – January 30, 2001) was a professional football player in the National Football League during the year of 1944. He played for "Card-Pitt" a team that was the result of a temporary merger between the Chicago Cardinals and Pittsburgh Steelers. The teams' merger was due to the league-wide manning shortages brought on by World War II.

Prior to playing professionally, Semes played at the college level for Duquesne University. In 1978, he was inducted into the school's sports hall of fame.
He and his wife, Libby, had three children; Ann Semes Lynch, James Semes, and Elizabeth "Beth" Semes.

References
Duquesne Sports Hall of Fame listing
2001 Player Deaths

1919 births
2001 deaths
Players of American football from Pennsylvania
Duquesne Dukes football players
Card-Pitt players